Telkomcel is a mobile telecommunication service located in Timor-Leste, owned by Telekomunikasi Indonesia International (TL) S.A.  The company was established on 17 September 2012. It has three main business areas: mobile services, corporate solution and wholesale and international services.

Since its official launch on 17 January 2013, Telkomcel has attracted more than 60,000 mobile subscribers and provides mobile coverage to 95% of Timor-Leste.

On 24 June 2013, Telkomcel joined the Bridge Alliance, an Asian-Australian-African alliance of mobile operators.

Network Service 

Telkomcel data network supported by 3G High Speed Download Packet Access (HSDPA) technology which is capable of transmitting data at up to 14.4 Mbit/s. Previous technology such as GPRS and EDGE are also available. In delivering 3G technology, Telkomcel using 850 MHz frequency. The advantage of this frequency is it ability to serve larger coverage, up to three times the coverage of 2.1 GHz frequency.

References

External links 
 www.telkomcel.tl
 www.bridgealliance.com

Dili
East Timorese brands
Internet service providers of East Timor
Mobile phone companies of East Timor
Online content distribution
Telecommunications companies established in 2012
Telecommunications companies of East Timor
Telkom Indonesia
2012 establishments in East Timor